<noinclude>
Tamaulipas is a state in Northeast Mexico that is divided into 43 municipalities. According to the 2020 Mexican Census, it is the fourteenth most populated state with  inhabitants and the sixth largest by land area spanning .

Municipalities in Tamaulipas are administratively autonomous of the state according to the 115th article of the 1917 Constitution of Mexico. Every three years, citizens elect a municipal president (Spanish: presidente municipal) by a plurality voting system who heads a concurrently elected municipal council (ayuntamiento) responsible for providing all the public services for their constituents. The municipal council consists of a variable number of trustees and councillors (regidores y síndicos). Municipalities are responsible for public services (such as water and sewerage), street lighting, public safety, traffic, and the maintenance of public parks, gardens and cemeteries. They may also assist the state and federal governments in education, emergency fire and medical services, environmental protection and maintenance of monuments and historical landmarks. Since 1984, they have had the power to collect property taxes and user fees, although more funds are obtained from the state and federal governments than from their own income.

The largest municipality by population is Reynosa, with 704,767 residents (19.97% of the state population), while the smallest is San Nicolás with 926 residents. The newest municipality is Río Bravo, established in 1961.

Municipalities

Notes

References 

 
Tamaulipas